St. Bonaventure University is a private Franciscan university in St. Bonaventure, New York. It has 2,381 undergraduate and graduate students. The Franciscan Brothers established the university in 1858.

In athletics, the St. Bonaventure Bonnies play National Collegiate Athletic Association Division I sports in the Atlantic 10 Conference. Students and alumni often refer to the university as Bona's, derived from the school's name.

History
The college was founded by Utica, New York, financier Nicholas Devereux, one of the first to gain land grants in newly surveyed Cattaraugus County from the Holland Land Company. Devereux founded the town of Allegany on the grant, hoping to build a new city. Devereux approached John Timon, the bishop of Buffalo, for assistance. The two invited the Franciscan order to Western New York, and a small group under Pamfilo da Magliano arrived in 1855. The school graduated its first class in 1858. St. Bonaventure's College was granted university status by New York State in 1950. The largest residence hall on campus, Devereux Hall, is named for the founder.

The Franciscan connection 
The university is named after Bonaventure (1221–1274), born John of Fidenza, who became a cardinal and Doctor of the Church. A theologian and contemporary of Thomas Aquinas at the University of Paris, he became head of the Franciscan order. Bonaventure was canonized in 1482 by Sixtus IV. The Franciscan friars at the St. Bonaventure Friary belong to the Holy Name Province and are members of the Order of Friars Minor, one of the orders of Franciscans.

The university is also home to the Franciscan Institute. Founded in 1939 by Thomas Plassmann, then president of St. Bonaventure's College, and led by its first Director, Philotheus Boehner.

Campus

The university has its own US Post Office and is listed as a separate census-designated place by the Census Bureau. The university's postal address is Saint Bonaventure, NY 14778. St. Bonaventure also has a second graduate studies center in Hamburg, a suburb of Buffalo, on the campus of Hilbert College.

Academics
The university has more than 50 academic programs, including programs in the Jandoli School of Communication, schools of Arts & Sciences, Business, Education and Health Professions, and combined-degree health care programs preparing students for careers in medicine, dentistry, physical therapy or pharmacy.

Research 
St. Bonaventure also has the Center for the Study of Attention, Learning & Memory, a joint initiative between the School of Education and the School of Arts and Sciences, promotes interdisciplinary research and increases awareness of the importance of attention and learning in education. The university also hosts the Franciscan Institute, which provides grants for research on the history and theology of the Franciscan Order.

Rankings 
On the U.S. News & World Reports 2022 list of best regional universities, St. Bonaventure University was ranked No. 9 for value and No. 20 in the North.

Student life

Media 
The campus newspaper, The Bona Venture, has been published continuously since 1926. Known on campus as The BV, the newspaper has earned The Pacemaker Award numerous times from the Associated Collegiate Press, the last time in 1994. The school's student radio station is known as WSBU 88.3 The Buzz. In 2019, the Jandoli School of Communication's student-produced newscast, "SBU-TV", became available to television viewers across Western New York.

Popular folklore 
Thomas Merton, the religious writer, taught English at St. Bonaventure for a year just at the start of World War II, living on campus on the second floor of Devereux Hall. It was at this school that Merton finally gave into his vocation and decided to join the Trappists. He entered the monastery in Kentucky in 1941. A heart-shaped clearing on a mountain in view of campus is linked to Merton in campus myth. Some students call it "Merton's Heart" and claim that Merton visited the place often and that the trees fell when he died. In reality, the hillside had been cleared for oil drilling in the 1920s and trees have since regrown, leaving the bald patch.

Athletics 

St. Bonaventure is an NCAA Division I member of the Atlantic 10 Conference and offers 19 varsity athletic programs. The school's programs are known as the Bonnies. The men's team has reached the NCAA men's basketball tournament a total of 8 times, most recently in the 2020–2021 season.

Notable alumni

 Jaylen Adams, basketball player
 Miles Aiken, basketball player
 Anthony Bannon, former director of George Eastman House, director of Burchfield-Penney Art Center
 Jim Baron, basketball coach
 Ed Bastian, CEO, Delta Air Lines
 Marion Beiter, mathematician
 Janet Bodnar, financial expert and editor
 John Boland, Buffalo labor priest
 J. R. Bremer, basketball player
 John R. Broderick, university president
 Jack Butler, NFL Hall of Fame
 JG Faherty (James Gregory Faherty), author
 Neil Cavuto, news anchor for Fox News and Fox Business
 Freddie Crawford, former NBA player
 Chuck Daly, basketball coach
 Charles J. Dougherty, President of Duquesne University
 Brett Dobson, Professional Lacrosse Player
 Ed Don George, professional wrestler
 Edward Goljan, Professor of Pathology at Oklahoma State University College of Osteopathic Medicine
 George Hays, football player
 Deb Henretta, Former Group President, Procter & Gamble
 Dan Herbeck, journalist
 Daniel Horan, Theologian and Author
 Louis Iasiello, former chief of naval chaplains
 Hughie Jennings, baseball player and manager
 Father Mychal Judge, chaplain, first official victim of the September 11 attacks
 George Kenneally, football player
 Patricia Kennealy-Morrison, author, journalist, editor
 Bob Lanier, Basketball Hall of Fame
 Michael Lynch, population geneticist and academic at Indiana University
 Ted Marchibroda, football coach
 Whitey Martin, former NBA player
 John McGraw, Major League baseball manager (NY Giants, Baltimore Orioles)
 Andrew Nicholson, basketball player
 Paul Owens, general manager with the Philadelphia Phillies
 Carl Paladino, 2010 New York State Republican gubernatorial candidate
 James Post, Professor
 Danica Roem, journalist and the among the first openly transgender politicians elected to serve in a state legislature, in Virginia.
 Thomas P. Ryan Jr., Mayor of Rochester, New York (1974–94)
 Irena Scott, author and physiologist
 Sam Stith, former NBA player
 Tom Stith, former NBA player
 Mike Vaccaro, sports journalist
 Denise Doring VanBuren, 45th President of the Daughters of the American Revolution
 Adrian Wojnarowski, sports journalist
 Catharine Young, New York State Senator

Pulitzer Prize winners
The school boasts six Pulitzer Prize winners as alumni, and one Alfred I. duPont–Columbia University Award winner, the broadcast equivalent of the Pulitzer. 
 Dan Barry 1980, reporter for The New York Times. Won in 1994 for investigative reporting (corruption in Rhode Island court system).
 Bill Briggs 1985, former reporter for the Denver Post. Won in 2000 for breaking news reporting (Columbine High School massacre).
 Robert A. Dubill 1958, former executive editor of USA Today. Won in 1980 for public service (uncovering religious fund-raising scandals).
 John Hanchette 1964, former managing editor of Gannett Newspapers, retired professor of journalism at St. Bonaventure. Won in 1980 for public service (uncovering religious fund-raising scandals).
 Charles J. Hanley 1968, reporter for the Associated Press. Won in 2000 for investigative reporting (the massacre at No Gun Ri).
 Brian Toolan 1972, vice president of The Hartford Courant. Won in 1999 for breaking news reporting (shooting at the Connecticut Lottery).

DuPont Columbia Award winners
  Charlie Specht 2010, chief investigative reporter for WKBW-TV. Won in 2020 for investigative reporting on clergy sex abuse and coverup by the Catholic Church.

Members of the United States Congress

 John Boccieri 1992, US Representative from Ohio (Dem., 2009–2011)
 James J. Howard 1952, US Rep from New Jersey (1965–1988)
 Rudolph G. Tenerowicz, US Representative from Michigan (Dem. & Rep., 1939–43, 49–57)
 James T. Walsh 1970, US Representative from New York (Rep., 1989–2009)
 William F. Walsh 1934, US Representative from New York (Rep., 1973–1979)

Notes

References

External links

 
 St. Bonaventure Athletics website

 
Franciscan universities and colleges
Liberal arts colleges in New York (state)
Catholic universities and colleges in New York (state)
Education in Cattaraugus County, New York
Association of Catholic Colleges and Universities
1858 establishments in New York (state)
Educational institutions established in 1858
Tourist attractions in Cattaraugus County, New York